The 1990 Volkswagen Damen Grand Prix was a women's tennis tournament played on indoor carpet courts in Leipzig in East Germany that was part of the Tier III category of the 1990 WTA Tour. It was the inaugural edition of the tournament and was held from 24 September until 30 September 1990. First-seeded Steffi Graf won the singles title and earned $45,000 first-prize money as well as 240 ranking points.

Finals

Singles
 Steffi Graf defeated  Arantxa Sánchez Vicario 6–1, 6–1
 It was Graf's 7th singles title of the year and the 51st of her career.

Doubles
 Gretchen Magers /  Lise Gregory defeated  Manon Bollegraf /  Jo Durie 4–6, 6–3, 6–1
 It was Magers' 2nd doubles title of the year and of her career. It was Gregory's 2nd doubles title of the year and the 5th of her career.

References

External links
 ITF tournament edition details
 Tournament draws

Sparkassen Cup
Sparkassen Cup (tennis)
Volkswagen Damen Grand Prix
Volkswagen Damen Grand Prix